Tim McLelland (formerly Tim Laming; 8 August 1962, in Sheffield – 6 November 2015) was a British aviation author, photographer and journalist. Self-taught with no formal qualifications, he went on to create over 40 different titles, which covered many different subjects. He died in the Macmillan Palliative Care Unit of the Northern General Hospital, Sheffield, in 2015.

Selected publications
Laming, Tim (1987) Modelling Aircraft Ian Allan; 
Laming, Tim (1994) The Royal Air Force Manual London: Cassell; 
McLelland, Tim (2013) Britain's Cold War Bombers Fonthill Media  (2016 ed)

References

1962 births
2015 deaths
Writers from Sheffield
Photographers from Yorkshire
British journalists